Yukio Okutsu (November 3, 1921 – August 24, 2003) was a United States Army soldier.  He is best known for receiving the Medal of Honor because of his actions in World War II.

Early life 
Okutsu was born in Koloa, Hawaii to Japanese immigrant parents. He was a Nisei, which means that he was a second generation Japanese-American.

Soldier
Okutsu joined the US Army in March 1943.

Okutsu volunteered to be part of the all-Nisei 100th Infantry Battalion.  This army unit was mostly made up of Japanese Americans from Hawaii and the mainland.

On April 7, 1945, Okutsu was serving as a technical sergeant in the 442nd Regimental Combat Team. During a battle on that day, on Mount Belvedere in Italy, he single-handedly destroyed three enemy machine gun emplacements. He was awarded the Army's second-highest decoration, the Distinguished Service Cross, for his actions.

A 1990s review of service records for Asian Americans who received the Distinguished Service Cross during World War II led to Okutsu's award being upgraded to the Medal of Honor. In a ceremony at the White House on June 21, 2000, he was presented with his Medal of Honor by President Bill Clinton. Twenty-one other Asian Americans also received the medal during the ceremony, all but six of them posthumously.

Okutsu died at age 81, three years after receiving the Medal of Honor, and was buried in East Hawaii Veterans Cemetery No. 2, Hilo, Hawaii.

Medal of Honor citation
His official Medal of Honor citation reads:
Technical Sergeant Yukio Okutsu distinguished himself by extraordinary heroism in action on 7 April 1945, on Mount Belvedere, Italy. While his platoon was halted by the crossfire of three machine guns, Technical Sergeant Okutsu boldly crawled to within 30 yards of the nearest enemy emplacement through heavy fire. He destroyed the position with two accurately placed hand grenades, killing three machine gunners. Crawling and dashing from cover to cover, he threw another grenade, silencing a second machine gun, wounding two enemy soldiers, and forcing two others to surrender. Seeing a third machine gun, which obstructed his platoon's advance, he moved forward through heavy small arms fire and was stunned momentarily by rifle fire, which glanced off his helmet. Recovering, he bravely charged several enemy riflemen with his submachine gun, forcing them to withdraw from their positions. Then, rushing the machine gun nest, he captured the weapon and its entire crew of four. By these single-handed actions he enabled his platoon to resume its assault on a vital objective. The courageous performance of Technical Sergeant Okutsu against formidable odds was an inspiration to all. Technical Sergeant Okutsu's extraordinary heroism and devotion to duty are in keeping with the highest traditions of military service and reflect great credit on him, his unit, and the United States Army.

See also

List of Medal of Honor recipients
List of Medal of Honor recipients for World War II

References

External links
 "Army Secretary Lionizes 22 World War II Heroes" at Defense.gov

1921 births
2003 deaths
United States Army personnel of World War II
United States Army Medal of Honor recipients
People from Kauai County, Hawaii
United States Army soldiers
American military personnel of Japanese descent
Recipients of the Distinguished Service Cross (United States)
World War II recipients of the Medal of Honor